Edson da Cruz Almeida (born 28 January 1994) is a Mozambican international footballer who plays as a centre back for Mozambican club Ferroviário de Nampula.

Club career
On 28 December 2014, Almeida made his professional debut with União de Madeira as a late substitute in the 2014–15 Taça da Liga Third Round Group D match against Braga. Almeida also started the Group D matches against FC Porto and Rio Ave F.C.

References

External links
 
 Stats and profile at LPFP 
 
 

1994 births
Living people
Mozambican footballers
People from Nampula Province
Association football central defenders
S.C. Olhanense players
Liga Desportiva de Maputo players
C.F. União players
Clube Ferroviário de Nampula players
Moçambola players
Mozambique international footballers
Mozambican expatriate footballers
Expatriate footballers in Portugal
Mozambican expatriate sportspeople in Portugal
AD Oeiras players